Mitzi Mayfair (born Juanita Emylyn Pique; June 6, 1914 – May 1976) was an American dancer and stage and film actress.

Life and career
Born  in Fulton, Kentucky, she grew up in St. Louis, Missouri. In 1936, she told a Harvard Crimson interviewer, "I guess I'm just a natural dancer". She recalled performing professionally albeit underage at age 11 in a "Kids Act". She was seen and hired by vaudevillian Gus Edwards and taken on tour; at one stop, "child labor authorities hauled her ... off the stage".

She continued to work in vaudeville and on stage. Mayfair was in at least four Broadway productions in the 1930s, including the Flo Ziegfeld's Follies in 1931 and Harry Akst's Calling All Stars in 1934. She joined the cast of At Home Abroad when star Eleanor Powell, also discovered by Gus Edwards, had to leave the show.

According to the Pittsburgh Post-Gazette, "the manager of the Main Street Theater in Kansas City" did not like her name, and changed it to Mitzi Mayfair without her knowledge; when she first saw the name on the marquee, she thought she had been replaced. However, the Brooklyn Daily Eagle had a different story, stating that Gus Edwards forgot her name and made one up.

During World War II, Mayfair embarked on a USO tour of Europe and North Africa with Kay Francis, Carole Landis, Martha Raye and others. All four performers played themselves in the film recreation of the tour, Four Jills in a Jeep (1944). Mayfair appeared in a number of shorts, but this and Paramount on Parade (1930) were her only feature film credits. The celebrated dancer Irene Castle considered having Mayfair – among others – play her in the film The Story of Vernon and Irene Castle, but decided she was not a big enough star. As Fred Astaire was already cast as Vernon, the part went to Ginger Rogers.

Personal life
Her first husband was Albert F. Hoffman, heir to a fortune from beverage-making. They married March 12, 1938 at Hoffman's brother's home in South Orange, New Jersey. They were divorced in 1943. On April 7, 1944, she married Charles Henderson, "associate boss of the music department of the 20th Century-Fox Studio". It is unclear when this marriage ended. 

On June 28, 1963, Mayfair married Fred S. Cook of Kitsap County, Washington. She died in Pima, Arizona in May 1976 at age 61.

References

External links

1914 births
1976 deaths
American female dancers
American film actresses
American stage actresses
Actresses from Kentucky
Actresses from St. Louis
People from Fulton, Kentucky
20th-century American actresses
Date of death missing
20th-century American dancers